The Shahin-1 and Shahin-2 are Iranian road-mobile truck mounted short-range fin-stabilized unguided 333 mm Artillery rockets. It was designed to be a cost-effective unguided rocket to destroy enemy troop concentrations, installations and fortifications at medium ranges. The rocket has been replaced in production by more capable artillery rockets however it is still in active uses.

Characteristics
In general both rockets are steel body unguided 333 mm 190 kg explosive fin stabilized rockets having seven nozzles with limited accuracy and assembling times of several minutes. They both are launched from unarmoured triple rail launchers.

Shahin-1
It is an unguided 2.9 m long 384 kg 190 kg high explosive 333 mm rocket with a range of 13 km. The rocket had forest green colour with two green, one red and one white stripe, its nose is itself painted white and red.

Shahin-2
It is an unguided 3.9 m long 530 kg 190 kg high explosive 333 mm rocket with a range of 20 km. It had a white painted body with two sets of green, white, and red stripes; on its warhead, it had red fins. It can also be used as an air-to-surface missile.

Operators
 Armed Forces of the Islamic Republic of Iran
 Armed forces of Sudan

See also

Other Iranian rockets
Oghab
Naze'at
Zelzal-1
Zelzal-2
Zelzal-3
Fajr-5
Arash
Tondar-69

Comparable systems
Jobaria Defense Systems Multiple Cradle Launcher
T-122 Sakarya

References

Rocket artillery
Artillery of Iran